Veriano Ginesi (2 March 1907 – 1 July 1989) was an Italian actor.

He is known for playing Barile in La mafia mi fa un baffo (1974), directed by Riccardo Garrone; and playing Angelo banker in Anche gli angeli mangiano fagioli (1973). He played a fat lady in Fellini's Roma (1972), Bald Onlooker at Tuco's 1st Hanging in The Good, the Bad and the Ugly (1966), and the truck driver in La Feldmarescialla (1967).

He also appeared in Cleopatra's Daughter (1960), Goliath and the Sins of Babylon (1963) as soldier, Hercules vs the Molloch (1963) as gladiator.

Filmography

References

Bibliography

External links
 

20th-century Italian male actors
Italian male film actors